Zirikly (Yerekle) is a rural locality (a selo) and the administrative centre of Ziriklinsky Selsoviet, Bizhbulyaksky District, Bashkortostan, Russia. The population was 506 as of 2010. There are 5 streets.

Geography 
Zirikly is located 14 km southwest of Bizhbulyak (the district's administrative centre) by road. Maly Sedyak is the nearest rural locality.

References 

Rural localities in Bizhbulyaksky District